Shim Eun-ha (born September 23, 1972) is a retired South Korean actress. Shim rose to popularity in the 1990s, starring in some of the highest-rated Korean dramas of all time, such as The Last Match, M and Trap of Youth. But she is best known for her acclaimed performance in Hur Jin-ho's melodrama Christmas in August, for which she swept the Best Actress awards in 1998. This was followed by another well-received turn in romantic comedy Art Museum by the Zoo. Shim suddenly retired from show business after the Dogme 95 film Interview, at the height of her fame in 2001, and her mystique solidified her status as the most beloved South Korean actress of that decade.

Career
Shim Eun-ha made her acting debut in 1993 after being recruited by MBC. In 1994, she starred in the basketball-themed TV drama The Last Match, and quickly became the nation's most popular and talked-about star. After more forays in television (including the horror drama M) and two lesser-known films (including Born to Kill with Jung Woo-sung), she made a permanent mark in the film industry with her performance in Hur Jin-ho's modern-day classic Christmas in August (1998). Later that year Art Museum by the Zoo, which presented a more down-to-earth side of the actress, saw her win over more critical praise for her acting abilities. Throughout this period, Shim consistently topped magazine polls as the most popular actress in the film industry.

In Trap of Youth (1999), Shim originated the anti-heroine in modern Korean dramas, when her innocent-looking character avenged herself upon her beloved who had betrayed her. The revenge drama was enormously popular, with viewer ratings soaring to 35.7 percent.

She then reunited with Han Suk-kyu in Tell Me Something (1999), and their star power combined to create one of the most highly anticipated works in Korean film history (though most viewers ultimately expressed disappointment at the film's convoluted narrative). The following year she appeared in Korea's first Dogme film Interview (2000) opposite Lee Jung-jae, which would end up being her last appearance.

Post-retirement
In 2001, after rumors surfaced of an engagement which was later called off, Shim was chased and hounded for months by reporters from local tabloids and entertainment programs. Because of this, she decided to quit acting, simply stating a desire for an ordinary life. In the ensuing years, despite periodic rumors that she would resume her film career, Shim has tried her best to remain out of the public eye, studying in France and taking up painting.

Personal life
In September 2005, Shim appeared in the news again when she announced in a press release that she was marrying Ji Sang-wook. The couple wed at a private ceremony attended by about 150 people at Aston House, Sheraton Grande Walkerhill Hotel in Seoul on October 18, 2005. At the time she reaffirmed that she will not return to acting. The couple have two daughters, the first born on March 2, 2006, and the second on November 28, 2007.

Having expressed regret that she hadn't pursued further education while she'd been acting, Shim entered the Korea National Open University in 2009 to study for a liberal arts degree. She then displayed her artwork at the 2009 Seoul Open Art Fair, where the Oriental ink-and-wash landscape paintings, done in classical Korean style, attracted attention for their exquisite detail. She sold her first painting at a fundraiser exhibit later that year.

After being appointed as spokesperson for the Liberty Forward Party, Shim's husband Ji unsuccessfully ran for mayor of Seoul in 2010. Ji subsequently joined the Saenuri Party and was elected a member of the National Assembly for Seoul in April 2016. Ji now joined Bareun Party.

Filmography

Film

Television series

Awards and nominations

See also
 Korean cinema
 Korean drama

References

External links
 
 
 

South Korean film actresses
South Korean television actresses
People from Yongin
1972 births
Living people
People from Seongnam
Best Actress Paeksang Arts Award (film) winners
Best Actress Paeksang Arts Award (television) winners